Markaz Academy English Senior Secondary School, Hojai is located Hojai, Assam, India. It is part of the Markaz group of schools run by Markazul Maarif.

The school was established in the year 1994. It is one of the branch of Markaz Group of schools, serving in different parts of Assam.

Teaching
The school currently prepares students for the HSLC and HSSLC exams conducted by the SEBA board and AHSEC of Assam. In the HS section two of the three streams are taught: science and the arts; commerce is not taught here. Instruction includes the basic subjects of English, Science, Maths, MIL subjects and Social Sciences.
The Markaz Academy group of schools imparts education based on Islamic Ideology. Being a residential school, students are taught basic Arabic, Fundamentals of Islam and Basic Islamic History.

History 
Markaz Academy was established in 1994 with the name ‘Markaz Academy’ both for Boys and Girls in separate campuses at Hojai in the year 1994 with only 82 students and 05 staff members. Now it has established 40+ schools under the name of ‘Markaz Academy’ which provide education mostly in the rural and socially backward areas of Assam.

Markazul Ma’arif established English Medium Residential schools with the name ‘Markaz Academy’ both for Boys and Girls in separate campuses at Hojai in the year 1994 with only 82 students and 05 staff members. Starting just with one school at Hojai in the year 1994, now it has established 43+ schools under the name of ‘Markaz Academy’ which provide education mostly in the rural and socially backward areas of Assam. The Markaz Academy Group of Schools has about 13,000+ students and 800+ staff across Assam in this academic year 2020.

Administration
List of administrative board of Markaz Academy:
 Principal - Shamsur Rabb Khan.
 Vice Principal - Firoz H Borbhuyan
 Hostel Superintendent - Abdul Hamid.
 Transport Incharge- Zakir Uddin.
 Academic Incharge - Zahir Zakaria.

Achievements
Champion of Taekwondo, NCC, Football, Cricket.

See also
Badruddin Ajmal
Markazul Maarif

Schools in Assam
Islamic schools in India
Hojai district
Educational institutions established in 1994
1994 establishments in Assam